Downthesun is the only studio album by American heavy metal band Downthesun, released on 1 October 2002 by Roadrunner Records.

Recording 
The album was recorded in a span of six weeks in late 2001 at The Warehouse Studio, Vancouver. Garth "GGGarth" Richardson served as the producer, and Shawn Crahan as executive producer. While planned to release in early 2002, problems with several labels resulted in the album ultimately being released in October.

Reception 
Unearth praised the album, considering its sound to be a fusion of nu metal and sludge metal, comparing its sound to that of Slipknot and Mudvayne. A mixed-to-negative review came from antiMusic, who accused the album of being unoriginal and comparing the vocal performances to other musicians associated with nu metal such as Jonathan Davis and Max Cavalera.

The album is often compared to Slipknot's 2001 album Iowa.

Track listing

Personnel

Downthesun 
 Nathan Church – keyboards, samples, vocals
 Anthony "Satone" Stevens – vocals
 Aaron Peltz – vocals
 Bruce Swink – guitar
 Lance "Kuk" Collier – bass
 Danny Spain – drums

Other duties 
 Garth Richardson – production
 Shawn Crahan – executive production, art direction, photography, design
 Michael "Elvis" Baskette – mixing
 Dean Maher – engineering
 Ben Kaplan – digital editing
 Chris Vaughan-Jones – production coordinator
 Stephen Marcussen – mastering
 Stefan Seksis – photography

Charts

References 

Heavy metal albums by American artists
2002 albums
Roadrunner Records albums